Esteban Huertas López (1876–1943) was a Colombian and later Panamanian military commander.

He was born in Boyacá, Colombia.  When he was 8 years old he ran away from home to join the army. Fighting in the civil war, he won many medals. In 1900 he lost his left arm when he fired a cannon. It was replaced by a wooden prosthesis. In 1902 he was promoted to the rank of general. Manuel Amador Guerrero managed to get Huertas on his side by spreading rumours that he would lose his title and be sent to the dangerous inlands of Colombia. In 1903 he took part in the revolution that led Panama to independence. On October 28, 1904 Huertas demanded two ministers from Amador's conservative cabinet resign. Fearing a coup, Amador disbanded the army and Huertas had to resign. Huertas died in Panama City in 1943.

Appearance in fiction 
Huertas is portrayed as "General Esteban" in The Sharpie of the Culebra Cut, a Scrooge McDuck comic by Keno Don Rosa that is set in Panama in 1906. In the comic, General Esteban is a villain who wants to seize power in Panama to enrich himself using the Panama Canal (which he plans to rename Esteban Canal, and it would make him one of the most powerful and richest dictators in the world). As Rosa could find no real life Colombian or Panamanian villains, he based the villain off Huertas but only named him "General Esteban" to try to make a different, fictional character. After great treasure discovered by Scrooge McDuck and Teddy Roosevelt, Esteban's visions of power grow even greater as he can hire mercenaries, build armaments and even his own navy with the ancient gold. However, he is knocked down by a Parita chief and extradited to Colombia. The Parita chief claims "we know well of the evil war chief Esteban".

External links
Basic information about Huertas

1876 births
1943 deaths
Panamanian military commanders